Louveciennes is a commune in the Yvelines department in the Île-de-France region in north-central France. It is located in the western suburbs of Paris, between Versailles and Saint-Germain-en-Laye, and adjacent to Marly-le-Roi.

Population

Sights

 Many castles from the 17th and 18th century (Chateau des Voisins, Chateau de Madame Du Barry, Chateau du Pont, Chateau du Parc, Chateau des Sources).
The Château de Louveciennes, built in 1700 by Louis XIV and given to Madame du Barry by Louis XV.
The Louveciennes Aqueduct of the Machine de Marly

Culture
Louveciennes was frequented by impressionist painters in the 19th century; according to the official site, there are over 120 paintings by Renoir, Pissarro, Sisley, and Monet depicting Louveciennes.

The composer Camille Saint-Saëns lived in Louveciennes from 1865 to 1870.

Marie Louise Élisabeth Vigée-Lebrun, the most famous female painter of the 18th century, died in Louveciennes on 30 March 1842.

Anaïs Nin was a popular Cuban novelist born in Neuilly, an area in Paris and lived in Louveciennes from 1930 to 1936 at 2 bis, rue Montbuisson. The start of her career as an author started in this town.

Louis, 7th duc de Broglie, physicist and Nobel Prize laureate, died in Louveciennes 19 March 1987.

Orchestra conductor Charles Munch resided in Louveciennes at Place Emile Dreux, in the village of  Voisins during the last decade of his life (1958–68).  A plaque to that effect has been placed on the residence.

History
Until 1964, Louveciennes belonged to the former Seine-et-Oise département.

NATO had barracks for SHAPE here from 1959–1967, and the American School of Paris was located nearby from 1959 to 1967.

Transport
Louveciennes is accessible by two Paris metro lines: LINE 17 Saint Nom la Bretèche - Le Chesnay - Versailles Rive Droite and LINE 17S: Maule - Le Chesnay - Versailles Rive Droite. Two bus routes to and from Paris which operate a night service are easily accessible. Lines 55-1 and LINE 55 -2 are used to go to Le Celle Saint Cloud, Bougival, and other western suburbs of Paris.

Economy
After SHAPE left France, the French government allocated the property to CII, which soon thereafter became part of CII Honeywell Bull.  Groupe Bull still has offices in Louveciennes.

Twin towns
Louveciennes is twinned with:
  Meersburg, Germany, at the shores of Lake Constance – since 1991

Notable people

 Christian Braut, musician and photographer
 Marcel Jean, Surrealist painter, writer, and sculptor
 Anaïs Nin, author
 Alfred Sisley, Impressionist painter
 Élisabeth Vigée Le Brun, (1755–1842) a prominent portrait painter, official portraitist of Marie Antoinette.

See also
Communes of the Yvelines department
 Shirley Jaffe

References

External links

Louveciennes official website (in French)
American School alumni view of Louveciennes
Church Saint Martin et Saint Blaise de Louveciennes
Committee for partnership between Louveciennes and their twin towns (in French)
Louveciennes 360 panoramas 

Communes of Yvelines
Louis XIV
Impressionist paintings
Île-de-France
Aqueducts in France
Palace of Versailles
Suburbs of Paris
Châteaux in France